Marmande (in Occitan, Marmanda) is a commune in the Lot-et-Garonne département in south-western France.

Geography
Marmande is located 35 km north-west of Agen, on the southern railway from Bordeaux to Sète. The town is situated at the confluence of the Trec with the Garonne on the right bank of the latter river, which is crossed at this point by a suspension bridge. There is a second bridge to the west of Marmande which connects the D933 from the Toulouse/Bordeaux motorway (A62) to the new by-pass, opened in July 2009, which now leads to Bergerac and the département of the Dordogne. Marmande station has rail connections to Agen, Langon and Bordeaux. Marmande ranks 481st in terms of population for the whole of France. A noted producer of tomatoes, a festival dedicated to tomatoes is held annually in July.

History
Marmande was a bastide founded about 1195 on the site of a more ancient town by Richard Cœur de Lion, who granted it a liberal measure of self-government. Its position on the banks of the Garonne made it an important place of toll. It soon passed into the hands of the counts of Toulouse, and was three times besieged and taken during the Albigensian Crusade, its capture by Amaury de Montfort in 1219 being followed by a massacre of the inhabitants. It was united to the French crown under Louis IX. A short occupation by the English in 1447, an unsuccessful siege by Henry IV in 1577 and its resistance of a month to a division of Wellington's army in 1814, are some important events in its subsequent history.

Population

Sights
Apart from the administrative offices, the most notable building is the church of Notre-Dame, which dates from the 13th, 14th and 15th centuries. The windows of the nave, the altarpiece of the 18th century and, in particular, the Renaissance cloister adjoining the south side, are some of its most interesting features.

The town is host to the Garorock music festival.

Economy
The town is renowned for its tomato production. The average income per household is 19,520 €/year

Sport
Marmande has a motorcycle longtrack and has hosted a number of World Championship grand-prix. The first, in 1997, was won by the English speedway rider Paul Hurry.

People linked to the commune
 Abel-Dominique Boyé : (1864–1934) born in Marmande ; painter
 Jean-Pierre Fourcade : born in Marmande 18 October 1929 ; Minister of Economy and Finances from 1974 to 1976 (Prime minister: Jacques Chirac) ; Minister of Equipment in 1976/1977 (Prime minister : Raymond Barre); Mayor of Boulogne-Billancourt (1995–2007) and Senator of Hauts-de-Seine since 1977.
 Hubert Ruffe : born in Penne-d'Agenais 29 August 1899, died 28 August 1995 ; active in the 1920s in defence of peasants, he was elected as a communist deputy for the Marmande constituency in 1946 and re-elected to this post seven times between 1946 and 1981. He appeared in 1974 in Jean-Daniel Simon' film Il pleut toujours où c'est mouillé, playing himself and describing the difficulties faced by peasants during that period.
 Renaud Jean : born in Marmande (1887–1961) ; leader of peasant syndicalism in France during the interwar period and first communist peasant deputy, in 1920, for the Marmande constituency. He was re-elected.
 Jean Cadenat : born 16 April 1908 in Marmande; died 28 June 1992 in Marmande, ichthyologist 
 Léopold Faye : born 16 November 1828 in Marmande ; died 5 September 1900 in Birac. He had been mayor of Marmande, then occupied national offices : Minister of public instruction, religion and fine arts (12 December 1887 – 3 April 1888), then Minister of Agriculture in 1889.
 Jean Jules Brun : born in Marmande 24 April 1849, died 1911, Minister of War under the Third Republic, from 24 July 1909 to 27 February 1911 (First government of Aristide Briand). General.
 Paul Bourrillon (1877–1942) : cyclist
 François Combefis : Dominican, born in Marmande in 1605.
 Tristan Derème : poet, born in Marmande in 1899.
 Pierrick Fédrigo : cyclist, born in Marmande 20 November 1978.
 Jean-Paul Cousin : graphic designer
 Jean-Pierre de Vincenzi : basketball trainer, born in Marmande 27 March 1957, trainer of the French basketball team that became vice champions at the 2000 Sydney Olympics. Technical director of the Fédération Française de Basket-Ball.
 Jean-Jacques Crenca : rugby union player
 Francesca Solleville : French singer, grand daughter of the Italian socialist Luigi Campolonghi, spent part of her childhood in Marmande. In 1990 she wrote a song called "Marmande" for her album Je suis ainsi.
 Laurent Queyssi : author, screenwriter and translator.
 Jean Baylac : former leader of a local resistance network, deputy mayor of Marmande, Deputy Poujadist in 1956.
 Robert Dangas : film director and photographer, was born in rue des Remparts 2 June 1942 and lived in Marmande until 1952.
 Jean-Claude Dubreuil : novelist
 Pierre Deluns-Montaud : 1845 – 1907, Deputy for Marmande constituency (6 April 1879 to 31 May 1898), Minister of public works (prime minister: Charles Floquet) 3 April 1888 to 14 February 1889.

Twin towns
Ejea de los Caballeros, Spain
Portogruaro, Italy
Peso da Régua, Portugal

See also
Côtes du Marmandais
Communes of the Lot-et-Garonne department

References

External links

 Official web site
 Grasstrack website

Communes of Lot-et-Garonne
Subprefectures in France
1195 establishments in Europe
1190s establishments in France
Agenais